Lilltjärnen is a lake in Strömsund Municipality in Jämtland, Sweden. Lilltjärnen belongs to Natura 2000 project.

Lakes of Jämtland County